Peltonychia is a genus of armoured harvestmen in the family Cladonychiidae. There are about nine described species in Peltonychia, found in Europe.

Species
These nine species belong to the genus Peltonychia:
 Peltonychia clavigera (Simon, 1879)
 Peltonychia gabria Roewer, 1935
 Peltonychia leprieuri (Lucas, 1861)
 Peltonychia leprieurii
 Peltonychia navarica (Simon, 1879)
 Peltonychia piochardi (Simon, 1872)
 Peltonychia postumicola (Roewer, 1935)
 Peltonychia sarea (Roewer, 1935)
 Peltonychia tenuis Roewer, 1935

References

Further reading

 
 
 

Harvestmen